Caldwell Farm, also known as The Caldwell Place, is a historic home and farm located near Washington, Franklin County, Missouri. The farmhouse was built about 1882, and is a two-story, central passage plan, red brick I-house. A rear ell was added about 1900 and extended about 1945. It sits on a rubble stone foundation and has a gable roof.  It features a two-story porch.  Also on the property are the contributing large barn (1897), two concrete silos, a poultry house, corn crib, feed-mixing shed, an old storage shed, garage and granary.

It was listed on the National Register of Historic Places in 1980.

References

Farms on the National Register of Historic Places in Missouri
Houses completed in 1882
Buildings and structures in Franklin County, Missouri
National Register of Historic Places in Franklin County, Missouri